Ellesmere College is a co-educational high school, located in Leeston in the Canterbury Region of New Zealand, with close to 500 students ranging from ages eleven to eighteen.  It aims to provide students with a range of learning experiences, aiming to make its students good contributors to society.  It encourages voluntary activities such as music lessons, drama, and sports.

History
Ellesmere College was founded in 1981, with a roll of 380 students, replacing Southbridge District High School.

Significant events
 1980 – Ellesmere College was built in Timaru and transported to the present site.  One classroom was lost during transportation in the Rakaia River.
 1981 – Ellesmere College opened in February with 380 students and 23 staff.
 1983 – The gymnasium was completed.
 1984 – The official opening of Ellesmere College was declared by Hon Merv Wellington.
 1985 – More classrooms were built.
 1986 – The gymnasium was enlarged and dedicated to Riki Ellison.
 1987 – The library was extended.
 1988 – The playground was opened.
 1994 – Ken Dawson was declared the new principal.
 1997 – The library was split to form a new classroom, L2l
 2000 – The Health Education Centre opened.
 2008 – The gym was extended and the Wilson room was opened.
 2008 – The last founding staff member retired.
 2009 – The new stage and seating areas were completed.
 2009 – Ken Dawson announced his resignation.
 2010 – Students, staff and guests welcomed Gavin Kidd into the role as principal.
 2017 - Gavin Kidd announced his resignation.
 2018 - Ronan Bass appointed as Principal.
 2019 - $30M significant redevelopment of school announced by Prime Minister Jacinda Ardern.

Notable alumni
 Sam Broomhall – All Blacks
 Daniel Carter – All Blacks

References

External links
The school's official website
Education Review Office (ERO) reports

Secondary schools in Canterbury, New Zealand
Educational institutions established in 1981
1981 establishments in New Zealand
Selwyn District